Apolipoprotein A-II is a protein that in humans is encoded by the APOA2 gene.

Function 

APOA2 encodes apolipoprotein A-II (ApoA-II), which is the second most abundant protein of the high density lipoprotein particles. The protein is found in plasma as a monomer, homodimer, or heterodimer with apolipoprotein D. Defects in this gene may result in apolipoprotein A-II deficiency or hypercholesterolemia.

Interactions 

ApoA-II has been shown to interact with phospholipid transfer protein.

Interactive pathway map

References

External links

Further reading 

 
 
 
 
 
 
 
 
 
 
 
 
 
 
 
 
 
 
 

Apolipoproteins